This is a list of members of the South Australian House of Assembly from 1989 to 1993, as elected at the 1989 state election:

 The Liberal member for Custance, John Olsen, resigned on 6 May 1990 to take up a casual vacancy in the Australian Senate. Liberal candidate Ivan Venning won the resulting by-election on 23 June.
 The member for Hartley, Terry Groom, was elected as a Labor member, but resigned from the party in 1991 after losing preselection to recontest his seat at the 1993 election.
 The Liberal member for Alexandra, Ted Chapman, resigned on 11 March 1992. Liberal candidate Dean Brown won the resulting by-election on 9 May.
 The Liberal member for Kavel, Roger Goldsworthy, resigned on 8 April 1992. Liberal candidate John Olsen won the resulting by-election on 9 May.
 The member for Elizabeth, Martyn Evans, was elected as an independent, but joined the Labor Party in late 1993.

Members of South Australian parliaments by term
20th-century Australian politicians